Toba Qalandar Shah is a town in the Punjab province of Pakistan. It is located at an altitude of 151 metres (498 feet).

References

Bahawalnagar District